Sherwood Lake is a lake in Berrien County, in the U.S. state of Michigan.

Sherwood Lake has the name of Harvey C. Sherwood, a settler at the lake.

References

Lakes of Berrien County, Michigan